Held by the Law is a 1927 American crime film directed by Edward Laemmle and written by Charles Logue. The film stars Ralph Lewis, Johnnie Walker, Marguerite De La Motte, Robert Ober, Fred Kelsey and Maude Wayne. The film was released on April 10, 1927, by Universal Pictures.

Cast         
Ralph Lewis as George Travis
Johnnie Walker as Tom Sinclair
Marguerite De La Motte as Mary Travis
Robert Ober as Boris Morton
Fred Kelsey as Detective
Maude Wayne as Ann
E. J. Ratcliffe as Henry Sinclair

References

External links
 

1927 films
American crime films
1927 crime films
Universal Pictures films
Films directed by Edward Laemmle
American silent feature films
American black-and-white films
1920s English-language films
1920s American films